Michelle Loughery (born 1961) is a Canadian muralist from British Columbia.

Life and work

Early career

Loughery was born in the community of Michel-Natal in the Elk Valley in southeastern British Columbia, but her family was relocated to the nearby mining town of Sparwood when the community of Michel-Natal was dismantled by the provincial government in the 1970s.

Work
Loughery has created mural projects in Cuba, Missouri Route 66 Mural City, US; Vernon, British Columbia, Heritage Murals; and country music themed murals in the Country Music Capital of Canada, Merritt, British Columbia. Her 9/11 mural commissioned by the Brooklyn Fire Department is on photographic display in the Smithsonian Museum.

Awards

 BC Community Achievement Award

References

 www.cubamurals.com
 http://www.ccmhalloffame.com

Sources
Sutherland, Jim. Murals Brighten Walls, Live. More Magazine. Summer 2008
Grant, Paul. BC Artist to Paint Sept.11th Mural for NYC School. CBC News. March 17, 2003.
British Columbian Achievement Foundation. Thirty Nine British Columbians Receive British Columbian Community Achievements Awards. March 15, 2005.
https://web.archive.org/web/20160304233957/http://www.conkie-law.ca/newsletter/december2008/loughery.html
http://www.merrittherald.com/on-a-wall-down-under/
http://www.vernonmorningstar.com/news/192597121.html
http://www.canadashistory.ca/Great-War-Album/About-the-Great-War/Prisoners-and-internees/Dan-Koneszynigi

External links
Official site
Additional magazine articles
 http://downtownvernon.com/things-to-do/murals

Canadian muralists
20th-century Canadian painters
21st-century Canadian painters
Living people
1961 births
Canadian women painters
People from the Regional District of East Kootenay
20th-century Canadian women artists
21st-century Canadian women artists
Women muralists